John Henry Stracey MBE (born 22 September 1950) is a British former professional boxer who competed from 1969 to 1978. He is a former welterweight world champion, having held the WBC and lineal welterweight titles between 1975 and 1976. At regional level, he held the British and European welterweight titles between 1973 and 1975, and is ranked by BoxRec as the 8th best British welterweight of all time.

Amateur career
Stracey competed for Great Britain as a lightweight at the 1968 Summer Olympics. He was defeated in the Round of 16 by eventual gold medallist Ronnie Harris. Stracey won the 1969 ABA light-welterweight championship.

Professional career

Early career
Stracey began his professional career on 17 September 1969, knocking out Santos Martins in two rounds. Stracey won his first twelve fights, eleven by knockout, but against obscure opposition. Fight number thirteen was against Teddy Cooper, on 19 January 1971. Cooper was not a big name in boxing either, but this fight ended in controversy when Stracey won by a fifth round disqualification. On 5 October 1971 Stracey drew (tied) in ten rounds against Frankie Lewis.

Stracey produced five more wins before being matched with Marshall Butler, on 25 May 1972, at the Royal Albert Hall, suffering his first defeat after being outpointed by Butler over eight rounds. He then put a string of four more wins together, before facing Bobby Arthur for the British welterweight title, on 31 October, at the Royal Albert Hall. He lost the fight with another controversial ending: This time, Stracey found himself disqualified in round seven. Stracey then won five more bouts in a row. In February 1973, Stracey traveled to the United States, were he fought Danny McAloon on the undercard of the first Ali vs. Bugner fight, at the Las Vegas Convention Center, on 14 February. Stracey won the bout via unanimous decision. He then met Bobby Arthur in a rematch on 5 June, this time winning the British title with a fourth-round knockout.

Stracey vs. Menetrey
On 27 May 1974, Stracey got his chance at the European welterweight title, fighting Roger Menetrey at the Stade de Roland Garros, in Paris, France. Stracey won via eighth-round knockout. On 29 April 1975, he defended his European title against Max Hebeisen, at the Royal Albert Hall, winning via RTD in the sixth round.

Stracey vs. Nápoles
During the 1970s, it was a common practice to give world title shots to boxers that held continental titles. For example, the OPBF (Oriental Pacific Boxing Federation) champion would be given priority over other challengers for world title fights. Stracey was not the exception, and, after winning five more fights in a row (including a win over Ernie Lopez), he received his first world title shot: challenging WBC welterweight champion José Nápoles, in Nápoles' home-town of Mexico City, Mexico, on 6 December 1975. Stracey was sent down in round one, but he recuperated to close Nápoles' eye and have referee Octavio Meyran stop the fight in the sixth round, Stracey winning the world championship by a technical knockout. The new champion declared, "He [Nápoles] could have knocked me down in every round but I'd have won it anyway". It was Nápoles' last fight.

1976
On 20 March 1976 he retained the title against perennial world title challenger Hedgemon Lewis by a knockout in round ten, but on 22 June, at Wembley, he lost the world title, being knocked out in twelve rounds by California-based Mexican Carlos Palomino. In his next fight, he lost to future world title challenger Dave Boy Green, with a badly damaged eye in round ten. Stracey retired as a winner when he knocked out George Warusfel in nine rounds in Islington on 23 May 1978.

Outside the ring
Stracey bought the Three Horseshoes pub in Briston, Norfolk, in 1975 and renamed it the John H Stracey.  In 2011 the pub reverted to its original name. He also had, at one point, a boxing school in London.

John also had a bar in Bournemouth called The Ring Side.

Professional boxing record

See also
List of world welterweight boxing champions
List of British world boxing champions

References

External links

|-

|-

|-

1950 births
Living people
English male boxers
Boxers from Greater London
People from Bethnal Green
People from North Norfolk (district)
Olympic boxers of Great Britain
Boxers at the 1968 Summer Olympics
England Boxing champions
British Boxing Board of Control champions
European Boxing Union champions
World Boxing Council champions
The Ring (magazine) champions
Welterweight boxers
World welterweight boxing champions